The Oklahoma Open Meeting Act (25 O.S. Sections 301–314) is an Oklahoma state law that requires that all meetings of public bodies (state and local boards and commissions) must be open to the public and that the public must be given advance public notice of such meetings. Such notice must include the specific time, place, and purpose of the meeting. Together with the Oklahoma Open Records Act, the Act serves to encourage the public to participate in and understand the governmental processes and governmental problems throughout the State.

The Oklahoma Open Meeting Act was signed into law by Governor David L. Boren on June 1, 1977.

See also
 Freedom of Information Act (United States)
 Oklahoma Open Records Act

External links
 Oklahoma Open Records Act on Sunshine Review
 Open Government Guide to Oklahoma
 FOI Oklahoma
 

Open Meeting
Oklahoma
Oklahoma
1977 in Oklahoma